Natchez–Adams County Airport , also known as Hardy–Anders Field, is a county-owned public-use airport located six nautical miles (11 km) northeast of the central business district of Natchez, a city in Adams County, Mississippi, United States.

Facilities and aircraft 
It has two asphalt paved runways: 13/31 is 6,500 by 150 feet (1,981 x 46 m) and 18/36 is 5,000 by 150 feet (1,524 x 46 m).

For the 12-month period ending January 31, 2009, the airport had 17,700 aircraft operations, an average of 48 per day: 93% general aviation, 5% air taxi, 2% military. At that time there were 33 aircraft based at this airport: 82% single-engine, 9% multi-engine, 6% jet and 3% helicopter.

Past airline service 

Historically, Natchez had scheduled airline service operated by Southern Airways for many years.  Southern commenced operations into the airport during the early 1950s with Douglas DC-3 aircraft.  The December 1, 1973 Southern Airways system timetable lists several flights a day to Jackson, Memphis, New Orleans and other destinations operated with 40-passenger Martin 4-0-4 propliners.  Trans-Texas Airways (TTa) also briefly served Natchez from 1959 through 1961 with flights to Jackson MS, and to Houston, TX with a stop in Alexandria, LA. TTa operated 21-seat Douglas DC-3s. After Southern ended all flights to Natchez in 1975, service was replaced by a commuter airline, South Central Air Transport (SCAT) which flew Handley Page Jetstream turboprops to Jackson, New Orleans and other destinations. SCAT was acquired by Air Illinois in 1977 which then extended their commuter service down south and served Natchez from 1977 through 1980. From 1980 through 1986 Royale Airlines operated commuter turboprop aircraft to Jackson and New Orleans.  Natchez then went without commercial air service until 1994 when Lone Star Airlines briefly operated Fairchild Swearingen Metroliner commuter propjet flights direct to Dallas/Fort Worth (DFW) via an intermediate stop in Nacogdoches, TX.  The airport has not had any scheduled airline flights since 1994.

References

External links 
 

Airports in Mississippi
Buildings and structures in Adams County, Mississippi
Transportation in Adams County, Mississippi